is the 39th single release by the J-pop group Morning Musume. It was released under the Zetima label on May 13, 2009. The CD was released in one regular and two limited editions, Limited A and Limited B, on the same day. The single ranked #1 on Oricon's weekly chart, making it their first #1 since their single "Aruiteru", released in late 2006, and the first #1 Morning Musume single featuring 8th generation members Aika Mitsui, Junjun, and Linlin. The Single V version of the single was released on May 20, 2009.

Contents 
The single includes a coupling track and an instrumental track of "Shōganai Yume Oibito". The coupling track, "3, 2, 1 Breakin' Out!", was the official theme song for Anime Expo 2009.

Both limited edition releases of the single sport different album covers and include DVDs containing alternate versions of the "Shōganai Yume Oibito" music video. The Limited A DVD contains "Shōganai Yume Oibito (Dance Shot Ver.)", a music video consisting completely of Morning Musume performing the dance created for the single. The Limited B DVD contains "Shōganai Yume Oibito (Close-up Ver.)", a video consisting completely of solo shots of the members.

The Single V DVD contains three tracks; the first being the regular version of the "Shōganai Yume Oibito" music video, the only version fully shown on television. The second and third tracks are "Shōganai Yume Oibito (Drama Ver.)" and a video showing the creation of the music videos.

Music videos 
Following the release of the single, Anime Expo announced on their website, that Morning Musume, in collaboration with MySpace, was holding a worldwide contest, to create a music video for a shortened version of "3, 2, 1 Breakin' Out!". Up-Front had released a set of videos of the Morning Musume members performing in front of a greenscreen for applicants to use upon agreeing to contest and usage rules. The results of the contest were announced at Anime Expo in July and the winner was awarded 390,000 yen.

Track listing

Featured lineup 
 5th generation: Ai Takahashi, Risa Niigaki
 6th generation: Eri Kamei, Sayumi Michishige, Reina Tanaka
 7th generation: Koharu Kusumi
 8th generation: Aika Mitsui, Junjun, Linlin

Shōganai Yume Oibito Vocalists

Main Vocal : Ai Takahashi, Reina Tanaka

Center Vocal : Risa Niigaki

Minor Vocal : Eri Kamei, Sayumi Michishige

3, 2, 1 BREAKIN'OUT Vocalists

Main Vocal : Ai Takahashi, Reina Tanaka

Center Vocal : Sayumi Michishige

Chart positions 

Total reported sales: 53,950 (as of June 17, 2009)

References

External links 
 "Shōganai Yume Oibito" entries on the Hello! Project official website: CD entry, DVD entry 

2009 singles
Morning Musume songs
Oricon Weekly number-one singles
Song recordings produced by Tsunku
Songs written by Tsunku
Zetima Records singles
Japanese-language songs
2009 songs